Christy Anderson is an architectural historian with a special interest in the buildings of the Renaissance and Baroque. She is currently a professor of Art and Architecture at University of Toronto.

She graduated from Johns Hopkins University with a B.A., from University of Massachusetts Amherst with an M.A. in the History of Art, and from Massachusetts Institute of Technology with a PhD from the School of Architecture in the History, Theory and Criticism of Art, Architecture and Urbanism Program.  
She taught at Yale University from 1995 until 2004.
She has lectured at the Courtauld Institute of Art, and Harvard University.

While at Yale University, she was the recipient of several teaching prizes, including the Sidonie Miskimin Clauss Prize for Teaching Excellence in the Humanities, Yale College (2001), the Sarai Ribicoff Award for the Encouragement of Teaching at Yale College (2001), and the Poorvu Family Prize for Interdisciplinary Teaching at Yale College (1997).

Awards
 2010 Guggenheim Fellowship
 2007 Canadian Centre for Architecture Visiting Research Scholar
 1992–1993 Samuel H. Kress Two-Year Fellowship in the History of Art at a Foreign Institution, Courtauld Institute of Art, University of London
 1992–1994 Worcester College, Oxford University, research fellow

Works
"Letter to an Undergraduate", Yale Review of Books, Spring 2004
British architectural theory, 1540-1750: an anthology of texts, Editors Caroline van Eck, Christy Anderson, Ashgate Publishing, Ltd., 2003, 
The Built Surface: Architecture and the pictorial arts from antiquity to the Enlightenment, Editors Christy Anderson, Karen Koehler, Ashgate, 2002, 
Inigo Jones and the classical tradition, Cambridge University Press, 2007,

References

American art historians
American expatriates in Canada
Johns Hopkins University alumni
University of Massachusetts Amherst alumni
MIT School of Architecture and Planning alumni
Yale University faculty
Living people
Year of birth missing (living people)
American women historians
Women art historians